The Woolworth Building is an historic structure located at 953 5th Avenue in the Gaslamp Quarter, San Diego, in the U.S. state of California. It was built in 1886, originally as a store for the F. W. Woolworth Company.

See also
 List of Gaslamp Quarter historic buildings
 List of Woolworth buildings

External links

 

1886 establishments in California
Buildings and structures completed in 1886
Buildings and structures in San Diego
F. W. Woolworth Company buildings and structures
Gaslamp Quarter, San Diego